Contwoyto Lake is a lake in the Kitikmeot Region of the Canadian territory of Nunavut, located near the border with the Northwest Territories.

Lupin Mine is located near Contwoyto Lake. The lake is also the terminus of the Tibbitt to Contwoyto Winter Road from Tibbitt Lake in the Northwest Territories, Nunavut's only currently existing road access to the rest of Canada. In 2005, there was a proposal put forward to extend the winter road to a possible port at Bathurst Inlet.

Climate

See also
List of lakes of Canada

Further reading
 Tremblay, Leo Paul. Geology of northern Contwoyto Lake area, district of Mackenzie. Ottawa: Information Canada, 1976.
 Steele, Peter. The Man Who Mapped the Arctic:The Intrepid Life of George Back, Franklin's Lieutenant. (2003), pp. 132ff.

References

External links
Contwoyto Lake at The Atlas of Canada
Case Study: Bathurst Inlet Port and Road Project - Canadian Environmental Assessment Agency

Lakes of Kitikmeot Region
Former populated places in the Kitikmeot Region